Ivor James John Lawton (born 5 September 1995) is an English football manager who manages Coventry United.

Playing career
Lawton joined Coventry City after being spotted playing for Mount Nod Juniors at the age of six. According to the then manager Tony Mowbray, in May 2015 he "earned the right for us to give him an offer of a new contract by his personality, his drive and conviction". He joined Conference North club Nuneaton Town on loan at the start of the 2015–16 season, and made his senior debut playing at right-back in a 1–1 draw with Stockport County at Liberty Way on 22 August. He made his professional debut for Coventry after coming on as a 76th-minute substitute for Conor Thomas in a 0–0 draw with Yeovil Town in a Football League Trophy match at Huish Park on 6 October 2015; Coventry went on to lose the penalty shoot-out 4–3. Manager Tony Mowbray said that Lawton had the potential to be a "iconic warrior figure" at the Ricoh Arena. However, he suffered serious knee ligament damage only a week after his debut and was ruled out of action for the rest of the 2015–16 season. He returned to fitness in October 2016, having spent 12 months on the sidelines. He was released in January 2017.

He had a trial at Port Vale in March 2017.

Lawton joined Halesowen Town in November 2017.

On 11 July 2019, Lawton signed for  side Stratford Town.

On 24 October 2019, Lawton signed for Alvechurch.

Style of play
Speaking in May 2014, Coventry City Academy manager Richard Stevens said that Lawton was "competitive, combative and a real aggressive midfield player" who was "a warrior and leader among men". He is also able to play across the defence.

Statistics

References

External links

1995 births
Living people
Footballers from Coventry
English footballers
Association football midfielders
Coventry City F.C. players
Nuneaton Borough F.C. players
Halesowen Town F.C. players
Stratford Town F.C. players
Alvechurch F.C. players
National League (English football) players
English Football League players